The Canadian Illustrated News was a weekly Canadian illustrated magazine published in Montreal from 1869 to 1883. It was published by George Desbarats.

The magazine was notable for being the first in the world to consistently produce photographs at a successful rate. This was possible with the financial backing of George Desbarats, as well as the invention of half-tone photoengraving by William Leggo. The Canadian federal MP Fabien Vanasse was one of the notable journalists of the publication.

More than 15,000 illustrations were published during the magazine's 14 years of existence, before it stopped publication as it accumulated losses.

The magazine had a French language counterpart also published by Desbarats called L'Opinion publique, that published many times the English magazine's illustrations and many of its articles translated into French.

Many notable prints in Canadian Illustrated News are kept in various museums. For example, a print by Henri Julien of the Royal Military College of Canada Uniform of Cadets, is in the Canadian War Museum in Ottawa, Ontario. A print by Arthur William Moore (1863–1909), a landscape artist, of the Royal Military College of Canada Kingston, Ontario "The Canadian Military College, From the Walls of Fort Henry c. 17 June 1876" is in the Library and Archives Canada.

Notable contributors
 Alexander Somerville
 John Henry Walker
 William Armstrong
 Rosanna Eleanor Leprohon
 Ellen Kyle Noel

See also
List of newspapers in Canada

References

External links
 Canadian Illustrated News digitized by Bibliothèque et Archives nationales du Québec

1869 establishments in Quebec
1883 disestablishments in Canada
News magazines published in Canada
Weekly magazines published in Canada
Defunct magazines published in Canada
Magazines established in 1869
Magazines disestablished in 1883
Magazines published in Montreal